Hamyang Yeo clan is one of the Korean clans. Their Bon-gwan is in Hamyang County, South Gyeongsang Province. According to the research held in 2015, the number of Hamyang Yeo clan was 34835. Their founder was  who was a Hanlin Academy in Tang dynasty, China. He was naturalized in Silla during the rebellion of Huang Chao.

See also 
 Korean clan names of foreign origin

References

External links 
 

 
Yeo clans
Korean clan names of Chinese origin